Ukraine Air Alliance is a cargo airline based in Kyiv, Ukraine. It operates services to Asia, Africa and Europe. Its main bases were Boryspil International Airport (KBP) and Zhuliany International Airport (IEV).

History 

The airline was established on 28 February 1992 and started operations in 1993. It registered with the Ukrainian authorities as a joint stock company and was one of the first private air enterprises in Ukraine to obtain international status through registration at ICAO. The airline got a "Positive TCO decision" in February 2017, however as of 5 October 2019, it was revoked and the airline was no longer allowed to operate within the EU airspace.

On 31 January 2020, Ukraine Air Alliance successfully received a renewed Air Operator Certificate and operates 4 An-12 aircraft with the following registration numbers: UR-CGV, UR-CAK, UR-CNT and UR-CZZ. All aircraft are equipped according to all latest requirements of ICAO and EASA. The airline has passed SAFA inspections  for compliance with the highest standards of flight safety.

Fleet

Current fleet
As of October 2019, prior to the crash of flight 4050 and its shutdown, the Ukraine Air Alliance fleet consisted 7 An-12 aircraft. After renewing the AOC in 2020, Ukraine Air Alliance fleet consists 4 aircraft:
UR-CGV, UR-CAK, UR-CNT and UR-CZZ

Former fleet
Ukraine Air Alliance has operated the following aircraft types in the past:
 Antonov An-2
 Antonov An-24
 Antonov An-26B
 Antonov An-28
 Antonov An-32B
 Antonov An-74
 Antonov An-124-100
 Ilyushin Il-76MD
 Ilyushin Il-76TD
 Mil Mi-8MT

Accidents and incidents
On 9 August 2013, Ukraine Air Alliance Flight 751, operated with an Antonov An-12BK (UR-CAG) burned on the ground at Leipzig Airport, Germany.  The aircraft had been loaded with live chicks and was preparing for takeoff when a fire broke out in the cargo area. The crew was able to escape before the fire completely destroyed the aircraft. An investigation revealed the fire's source to be an uncontained failure of the auxiliary power unit (APU).

On 30 August 2014, Ukraine Air Alliance Flight 4012, an An-12BK (UR-DWF) crashed into mountainous terrain shortly after departing Tamanrasset Airport, Algeria for Malabo, Equatorial Guinea. There were no survivors among the seven crew members.
On 4 October 2019, Ukraine Air Alliance Flight 4050, an An-12BK (UR-CAH) crashed on approach to Lviv-Danylo Halytskyi Airport, Ukraine, inbound from Vigo, Spain. 5 of the 8 people on board died. Photos from the scene suggest the aircraft landed in shrubs about 1,5 km short of the runway. The aircraft sustained serious damage. The cause of the accident is perceived to be pilot error due to fatigue.

References

External links
 Official website

Airlines of Ukraine
Airlines established in 1992
Airlines disestablished in 2019
1992 establishments in Ukraine
2019 disestablishments in Ukraine